Phryneta densepilosa is a species of beetle in the family Cerambycidae. It was described by Stephan von Breuning in 1973. It is known from Ghana.

References

Endemic fauna of Ghana
Phrynetini
Beetles described in 1973